Saburō Hyakutake (June 3, 1872 – October 30, 1963) was an Imperial Japanese Navy admiral.

Biography
Hyakutake was born in Saga Prefecture. His younger brothers Gengo and Harukichi also became high ranking military officers.

Hyakutake was a graduate of the Imperial Japanese Naval Academy and the Naval War College. He was a veteran of the First Sino-Japanese War (1894–1895) and the Russo-Japanese War (1904–1905). He was Grand Chamberlain of Japan (1936–1944). He was a recipient of the Order of the Rising Sun and the Order of the Sacred Treasure.

Bibliography
 Asian Historical Document Center "常備艦隊及附属艦船乗員表" (List of Crewmen of the Standing Fleet and Attached Vessels),（ref:C06061767700）.
Fukukawa Hideki『日本海軍将官辞典』(Dictionary of Japanese Naval Officers), Fuyōshobō, 2000.
 Hando Kazutoshi and others "歴代海軍大将全覧" (Complete List of All Admirals of the Japanese Navy),  Chūō Kōron Shinsha、2005.
 Hata Ikuhiko, ed. "日本陸海軍総合事典 第2版" (Comprehensive Encyclopedia of the Imperial Japanese Navy and Army, Second Edition), Tōkyō Daigaku Shuppankai, 2005.
 Toyama Misao, ed. "陸海軍将官人事総覧 海軍篇" (Personnel Sourcebook on Japanese Military Officers, Navy Edition), Fuyōshobō, 1981.

References

External links

1872 births
1963 deaths
People from Saga Prefecture
Imperial Japanese Naval Academy alumni
Naval War College (Japan) alumni
Imperial Japanese Navy admirals
Japanese military personnel of the First Sino-Japanese War
Japanese military personnel of the Russo-Japanese War
Grand Cordons of the Order of the Rising Sun
Recipients of the Order of the Sacred Treasure, 1st class